Pooja Sawant (born 25 January 1990) is an Indian dancer, performer, film actress. She works in Marathi and Hindi movies. She is best known for her role in the 2015 blockbuster hit Dagadi Chawl.

Career 
Before starting her career in films, Pooja won a beauty pageant "Maharashtra Times Sharavan Queen" in 2008. She started her career in Marathi Industry with the multistarrer film Kshanbhar Vishranti, which acquired cult status among movie lovers. In 2011, she appeared in Zhakaas opposite Ankush Choudhary, the movie was a blockbuster. Pooja again appeared in another multistarrer movie, Satrangi Re.

In 2014, she appeared in the satire blockbuster movie Poshter Boyz, opposite Aniket Vishwasrao.

As of March 2020, she is appearing in Bali, a horror film by Vishal Furia, director of her 2017 film Lapachhapi, which is slated to release on 16 April. She is set to appear in Daagdi Chawl 2, opposite Ankush Chaudhari, and Luv U Mitra, opposite Gashmeer Mahajani.

Apart from films, Pooja has been a part of several Marathi reality shows, including Ek Peksha Ek Jodicha Mamala and Jallosh Suvarnayugacha.

Filmography

Television

References

External links

 

Living people
Actresses in Marathi cinema
Indian film actresses
Marathi actors
1990 births